Khid or KHID may refer to:

KHID, broadcasting signals of KJJF
Khid (DJ), one of the stage names of Finnish disc jockey DJ Kridlokk